Louis Gibzen (born Louis Gibson Hurndall), is a British hip-hop/electro record producer of Barbadian descent. He was raised in Middleton, Greater Manchester, and is known as a promising upcoming producer throughout the UK. He produced the record "Stay with Me" for Ironik's debut album.

The record hit No. 5 on the UK Singles Chart whilst Gibzen was just 16. Since then he has produced tracks for Joe Budden's mixtape Mood Muzik 3 and Maino's The Hand of God. He has also worked with Sway, Chipmunk, Rhea, Pyrelli, S.B.D., Wiley and Red Cafe. Gibzen also produced Fugative's single "Sticks And Stones" with Anthony Anderson & Steve Smith. He has recently produced for Akon, Wiz Khalifa, The Weeknd and on Wretch 32's upcoming album.

Gibzen has made various instrumentals for American dance crew Jabbawockeez; one being titled "Forever".

He also has his own production company and music site. In 2012 Gibzen revealed that he and his label are releasing a Champagne in partnership with footballer Mario Balotelli called LF Champagne.

Gibzen's productions are being used for the E4 show Youngers.

Notable production credits
 "Stay With Me" (DJ Ironik)
 "Introvert Me"  (Pyrelli)
 "Man of the Match" (Sway DaSafo)
 "Sticks & Stones (production & songwriting)"  (Fugative)
 "For The Money"  (Ya Boy)
 "Lose My Life" (Chipmunk)
 "Cliche" (Loick Essien)
 "Get It Tonight" (Loick Essien)
 "Life's Just A Playground" (Mims)
 "Wait & See" (Smiler)
 "Spender" (Smiler feat. Lana Del Rey)
 "Exist" (Nicole Scherzinger)
 "I'm Dreaming" (Wretch 32)
 "Us Against The World" (Clement Marfo & The Frontline)
 "Overload (songwriting)" (Dot Rotten)
 "Sing For Tomorrow (piano)" (Sneakbo)
 "Another Night Alone" (K'Naan)
 "Enemy" (The Weeknd)
 "I Don't Want It (co-production & songwriting)"  (Akon)
 "Rock Bottom (co-production)"  (Zak Abel)

References

External links
 Myspace site

British record producers
Living people
1991 births
Black British musicians
People from Middleton, Greater Manchester